Ohanyan or Ohanian (Western Armenian Օհանեան) is a common Armenian surname.

Ohanian
Alexis Ohanian (born 1983), American internet entrepreneur, activist and investor and co-founder of the social news website Reddit and more recently the husband of American female tennis player  Serena Williams
Armen Ohanian (1887–1976), Armenian dancer, actress, writer, and translator
Lee E. Ohanian (born 1957), macroeconomist and university lecturer 
Melik Ohanian (born 1969), French contemporary artist
Ovanes Ohanian (1896–1960), Armenian-Iranian filmmaker, inventor, founder, doctor, scientist 
Raffi Ohanian (born 1989), Armenian singer, winner of 2009-2010 season of Hay Superstar
Vartine Ohanian (born 1984), Lebanese politician of Armenian descent

Ohanyan
Seyran Ohanyan, (born 1962), Armenian politician and minister

See also
Mike Connors (born 1925), real name Krekor Ohanian, American actor best known for playing detective Joe Mannix in the TV series Mannix

Armenian-language surnames